The Hokersar is a wetland conservation area in Zainakote, near Srinagar city in Srinagar district of Jammu and Kashmir, India.

Geography
The Hokersar wetland, which is the largest bird reserve in the Kashmir Valley, is situated in the Jehlum River basin. The reserve is fed by the two perennial inlet streams; Doodhganaga from the east and Sukhnag from the west. In the spring, the water level rises to as much as  due to runoff from snowmelt in the Pir Panjal mountain range. The wetland also acts as an absorption basin for floodwaters.

Flora and fauna
The Hokersar wetland consists of three zones with varied flora. The northeastern zone contains various dense macrophytes while Trapa natans and Phragmites australis are found predominantly in the central zone, which is a large expanse of water. The southern zone is a silted portion and acts as pasture land.

The Hokersar wetland is a designated bird sanctuary. It serves as an important staging ground for medium and long distance migratory shorebirds, geese, cranes, ducks and other species that breed in the northern latitudes of Siberia and Central Asia. The Valley of Kashmir as a whole is strategically located south of the Pamirs and at the western extremity of the Himalayan range. The waterbirds fly to Kashmir Valley via the Central Asian Flyway. They begin to arrive in September–October and leave by May. Over 500,000 waterbirds were recorded in the Hokersar Wetland in 2000–01. There were seven globally threatened species among the 45 waterbird species and 66 wetland-associated bird species reported in the reserve. Northern pintail, mallard, gadwall, northern shoveller, Eurasian wigeon and common teal are the most common waterfowl, found in large numbers during the winter. Eurasian coot, red-crested pochard, greylag goose, common pochard, garganey, and ruddy shelduck are among the other species of waterbirds also found in the reserve.

Conservation
The Hokersar wetland was first designated as a conservation reserve under the Jammu and Kashmir Wildlife (Protection) Act, 1978. Hokersar, Haigam and Shallabug are protected areas within the Jhelum basin and have also been declared as bird sanctuaries by the government of Jammu & Kashmir. In 2005, the reserve was recognised as a wetland of international importance under the Ramsar Convention as Hokera Wetland. It falls under India's National Wetlands Conservation Programme and is also included in the network of Important Bird Areas.

Threats
Threats to the Hokersar wetland include human activities and encroachments. Over time, many areas of the wetland have been converted into paddy cultivations. Discharge of the domestic waste into the wetland, primarily through the inlet streams, has led to excessive weed growth and eutrophication, both of which pose a great threat to the reserve's flora.

References

External links
 

 

Bird sanctuaries of India
Protected areas of Jammu and Kashmir
Kashmir
Lakes of Jammu and Kashmir
Ramsar sites in India
Wetlands of India
2005 establishments in Jammu and Kashmir
Protected areas established in 2005